A clarinet–violin–piano trio is a standardized chamber musical ensemble made up of one clarinet, one violin, and one piano participating in relatively equal roles, or the name of a piece written for such a group.

An example of a clarinet–viola–piano trio existed several hundred years before the clarinet–violin–piano trio; Mozart composed the Kegelstatt Trio in the 18th century, and the Romantic composer Max Bruch composed a suite of eight pieces for this combination, as well as a double concerto for viola, clarinet, and orchestra.  Many of these works can be (or already have been) transcribed for a clarinet–violin–piano trio.

Unlike a standard piano trio or a concerto, there is no standard form for a composition for a clarinet–violin–piano trio: a piece can have any number of movements.

Acoustically, the choice of a clarinet, violin, and piano is characteristic in that most chamber music (and most music in general) contains high (soprano), mid-range (alto/tenor), and low (bass/baritone) parts.  However, both a clarinet and a violin play relatively high-pitched parts, making for a less-balanced sound than a trio that contains a more possible range, such as a violin–cello–piano trio. Timbral contrast is provided between the woodwind (clarinet), bowed string (violin), and keyboard instrument (piano).

Aside from its classical use, this combination of instruments is common in traditional Ashkenazi Jewish music.

Early 20th century
There are examples of clarinet–violin–piano trios prior to 1970 by composers including Bartók (Contrasts), Baußnern's Serenade, Stravinsky (an arrangement of his L'histoire du soldat), Milhaud (Suite for clarinet, violin, and piano, Op. 157b), Khachaturian (Trio for clarinet, violin and piano), Berg, Krenek, and Ives.

Bartók's Contrasts

Béla Bartók's Contrasts was commissioned for violinist Joseph Szigeti and clarinetist Benny Goodman and is one of the best known pieces in the genre. Kárpáti describes the piece as possessing "technical bravura and at the same time...poetic versatility". In contrast, E.R., explains that the "contrasts are "of speed rather than of mood" but that despite this "lack of variety...Bartók's genius consists in gifts of rhetoric so rich that he can spread this one mood, and spread it interestingly, over a score or more of large-scale works".

Seiber considers it "a less weighty, less important work in Bartók's whole œuvre" though the "writing for both violin and clarinet" are "most effective throughout". An article describing a program in which "the standard note on Bartók's Contrasts...was replaced by a sequential, diagrammatic sketch," concluded that, "in fact, Bartók looks as inscrutable as he sounds".

Later 20th century
Trios were commissioned by the Verdehr Trio from composers including Leslie Bassett, Alan Hovhaness, Michael Daugherty, Karel Husa, Thea Musgrave, Ned Rorem, Ida Gotkovsky, Gunther Schuller, Peter Schickele, Jennifer Higdon, Alexander Arutiunian, David Diamond, Scott McAllister, William Bolcom, Betsy Jolas, Bright Sheng, Roberto Sierra, Libby Larsen, Philippe Manoury, Gian Carlo Menotti, Peter Sculthorpe, Iván Erőd and Joan Tower.

Rorem's The End of Summer (1985), which may be found on several recordings featuring his work, features hints of church music. The composer describes the piece's similarities to its direct predecessor, his Scenes from Childhood, in that each of three movements is "suggested by musical works of yore. There are suggestions of Satie, Brahms, hopscotch ditties and Protestant anthems." Rorem says his, Musgrave's, and Dickinson's pieces all "quote literally from the past" and also describes asking "Chuck" if he ever disapproved of Samuel Barber's pieces as Rorem's partner did of Rorem's the evening it premiered.

Schuller's A Trio Setting, in "the classical fast-slow-scherzo-fast form" shows the influence of Bartók but is described as "original...varied, affecting and exciting by turns, and inventive" worth listening to again.

Nathan Currier's Variations is described as "more difficult" and seemingly "too long at almost 34 minutes." It repeatedly quotes as a theme a song from Binchois, "De plus en plus", sounding like a Brahms lullaby. The piece also shows the influence of Bartók's Contrasts.

Husa's Trio Setting [W22], commissioned by the Verdehr Trio in 1981, showcases each instrument in one movement and has been described by William Crutchfield as, "standout...with its sure sense of climax and dramatic variety in the instrumental handling."

Thea Musgrave's Pierrot was commissioned by the Verdehr Trio and first performed in Istanbul, Turkey, in 1986. Consistent with Musgrave's earlier work, such as her Second Chamber Concerto (1966), Clarinet Concerto (1967), and Space Play (1974), Pierrot is highly programmatic and the score contains indications for stage locations, lighting plots, and movements.

Concertos
Clarinet–violin–piano concertos have been commissioned by Verdehr from Buhr, David, Ott, Skrowaczewski, and Wallace. They have also commissioned violin-clarinet double concertos from James Niblock, William Wallace, Dinos Constantinides, Paul Chihara, Ian Krouse and Richard Mills.

Composers of clarinet–violin–piano trios
(This is an incomplete list.)

Early 20th century

1949 onwards

Current clarinet–violin–piano trio ensembles (2018)
(This is an incomplete list.)

Notes

Sources
Carbon, John. "Pierrot for Violin, Clarinet and Piano by Thea Musgrave", Notes, 2nd Ser., Vol.50, No. 2. (Dec., 1993), pp. 761–762.
E. R. (1943) ."Review: Contrasts, for Violin, Clarinet and Piano by Béla Bartók", Music & Letters, Vol. 24, No. 1. (Jan., 1943), p. 61.
Hitchens, Susan Hayes (1991). Karel Husa: A Bio-Bibliography. .
Kárpáti, János (1981). "Alternative Structures in Bartók's 'Contrasts'", Studia Musicologica Academiae Scientiarum Hungaricae, T. 23, Fasc. 1/4, Centenrio Belae Bartók Sacrum#.
Max, Stephen R. "Verdehr Trio 3." American Record Guide 57.n6 (Nov-Dec 1994): 218(1).
Rorem (2002). Lies: A Diary: 1986-1999. .
Seiber, Mátyás (1949). "Béla Bartók's Chamber Music", Tempo, New Ser., No. 13, Bartók Number. (Autumn, 1949), pp. 19–31.

External links
Rockwell, John " Concert: Verdehr Trio" Review, NYTimes.com. Published: February 18, 1988.
The Verdehr Trio website.

Chamber music
 
 
 
 
Types of musical groups